Penicillium tardochrysogenum is a filamentous species of fungus in the genus Penicillium which produces penicillin, secalonic acids D and secalonic acids F.

References

Further reading 
 

tardochrysogenum
Fungi described in 2012